Demirci yayla is a massif and regional nature reserve (zakaznik) located in Crimea, a region internationally recognised as part of Ukraine but occupied by Russia since 2014. The yayla is best known for the Valley of Ghosts, a rock-filled valley situated in the massif.

Description 
The yayla is composed of components dating back to the Late Jurassic period. There are a total of 16 caves in Demirci yayla, many of which are named after Russian and Soviet biologists such as Georgy Fedorovich Morozov, Evgenii Wulff, and Georgy Vysotsky. The area is home to more than 420 varieties of flora, as well as Quercus pubescens, Lithocarpus, Carpinus betulus, Fagus sylvatica, and Pinus nigra.

The  is located at the foot of Southern Demirci.

At the top of the mountain, a rare atmospheric phenomenon known as the Brocken spectre can be seen during sunrise. To observe the "ghost" appearance, several conditions must be met: Chatyr-Dag must be shrouded in mist and the area over the sea and Demirci yayla must be clear, transparent and completely permeable to sunlight. During sunrise, it is possible to see shadows projected on the background of Chatyr-Dag, shrouded in mist, surrounded by a circular rainbow halo.

The word demirci translates literally from Crimean Tatar as "blacksmith". According to Crimean Tatar folklore, a blacksmith on living the mountain captured a young woman, who fell to her death while trying to escape. As a result of the woman's death, the mountain's deity, in anger, caused boulders to rain on the area, killing the blacksmith and destroying the nearby village.

In 1894, a rockslide occurred at Demirci yayla, causing the destruction of four houses within a village. Following the events, the local population subsequently evacuated and re-established themselves elsewhere, under the name of Demirci (now known as ).

Nature reserve 
On 30 March 1981, Demirci yayla was declared a zakaznik of national importance by the government of the Ukrainian Soviet Socialist Republic. This designation has continued to the modern day under both the Ukrainian and Russian governments.

References 

Crimean Mountains
Mountain ranges of Russia
Mountain ranges of Ukraine